Kira Nicole Kosarin (born October 7, 1997) is an American actress and singer, known for her role as Phoebe Thunderman on the Nickelodeon series The Thundermans. On April 10, 2019, she independently released her debut album, Off Brand, later signing with Republic Records in 2022.

Early life
Kosarin did dance and gymnastics in her early years. She studied ballet at Boca Ballet Theatre and attended middle school at Pine Crest School. Her parents were Broadway performers, her mother as an actress and her father as a music director, conductor and record producer, so she grew up acting, singing and dancing. After attending an "acting on camera" workshop, she decided to move to Los Angeles, California, in 2011 to pursue a career in acting.

Kosarin's family are of Ashkenazi Jewish descent, with ancestors from Eastern Europe.

Career

Acting 
Kosarin made her television debut in an episode of the Disney Channel sitcom Shake It Up. Then, in 2013, she rose to fame when she began portraying the role of Phoebe Thunderman in the Nickelodeon comedy The Thundermans. In 2015, Kosarin was nominated for a Kids' Choice Award in the Favorite TV Actress category, but the award went to Laura Marano. She was again nominated for the 2016 Kids' Choice Award for Favorite TV Actress and again did not win, though she and her castmates won the award for Favorite TV Show for The Thundermans. Her Nickelodeon television film, One Crazy Cruise (originally titled Tripwrecked), was filmed in fall 2014 in Vancouver, British Columbia, and premiered on June 19, 2015. In April 2019, it was announced that Kosarin would appear in the second season of the Hulu horror series Light as a Feather, in which she portrayed the role of Nadia.

Music 
On February 24, 2018, Kosarin announced her debut single, "Spy", which was released on March 16, 2018. On January 11, 2019, Kosarin released her next single, "Vinyl", which was accompanied by a music video.   This was followed by three subsequent singles, "Love Me Like You Hate Me", "47 Hours" and "Take This Outside". Her debut album, Off Brand, was released on April 10, 2019. In July 2019, Kosarin was set to embark on a headline tour across the United Kingdom to promote the release of Off Brand, but this was later cancelled due to "scheduling conflicts". On November 8, 2019, Kosarin released her next single, "Simple", a collaboration with American DJ Carneyval. Kosarin also has a YouTube channel where she posts music covers and songs. On July 15, 2020, she independently released an extended play, Songbird. In March 2022, it was announced that Kosarin had been signed to Republic Records. She released her debut major-label single, "Mood Ring", on March 11, 2022.

Filmography

Discography 
 Off Brand (2019)
 Songbird (EP) (2020)
 Something New (EP) (2022)

Awards and nominations

References

External links
 
 

1997 births
Living people
21st-century American actresses
21st-century American singers
Actresses from Florida
American Ashkenazi Jews
American child actresses
American child singers
American television actresses
People from Boca Raton, Florida
Republic Records artists
Pine Crest School alumni